Ichthyophis weberi, the Malatgan River caecilian, is a species of amphibian in the family Ichthyophiidae endemic to the Philippines. Its natural habitats are subtropical or tropical moist lowland forests, subtropical or tropical moist montane forests, rivers, intermittent rivers, plantations, rural gardens, heavily degraded former forests, irrigated land, and seasonally flooded agricultural land.

In 2011, the species was found in Cleapatra's Needle, a diverse landscape of ancient rainforest in Palawan, after 50 years of disappearance.

References

weberi
Amphibians of the Philippines
Amphibians described in 1920
Endemic fauna of the Philippines
Fauna of Palawan
Taxonomy articles created by Polbot